Abraham Cruz is a Filipino actor.

Filmography
1946 — Dugo ng Bayan  [Palaris]  
1947 — Sanggano  [Palaris]
1949 — Hindi ako Susuko  [Premiere] 
1950 — Tatlong Balaraw  [Premiere]
1954 — Lourdes  [Balatbat-Flores]  
1954 — Si Og sa Army  [Larry Santiago]  
1955 — Mag-asawa'y di' biro  [People's]  
1955 — Ha Cha Cha  [People's]  
1956 — Buhay at Pag-ibig ni Dr. Jose Rizal  [Balatbat & Bagumbayan]
1957 — Bicol Express  [Premiere]
1957 — H-Line Gang  [Premiere]  
1958 — The Singing Idol  [Premiere]  
1958 — Anak ng Lasengga  [People's]

External links
 

Abraham
Living people
Filipino male film actors
Year of birth missing (living people)